Millu (Aymara for a kind of salpeter, Quechua for salty, Hispanicized spelling Millo) is a mountain in the Andes of southern Peru, about  high. It is situated in the Moquegua Region, Mariscal Nieto Province, Carumas District. Millu lies south of the mountain Uma Jalsu.

References

Mountains of Moquegua Region
Mountains of Peru